"Descriptive Fantasie on the Battles of Chattanooga, Lookout Mountain and Missionary Ridge" is a piano score arranged by Alberto Riveri. The score was published in 1889 by P.R. McCargo & Co., in Boston, MA.

The sheet music can be found at the Pritzker Military Museum & Library.

References 

Piano compositions by American composers
1889 compositions
Songs of the American Civil War